

"Shotgun" is a song written by Junior Walker and recorded with his group the All Stars. Called a "dance tune", it was produced by Berry Gordy Jr. and Lawrence Horn.  Gordy's Soul Records, a Motown Records subsidiary, issued it as a single in 1965. It reached number 1 on the U.S. R&B Singles chart for four non-consecutive weeks and peaked at number 4 on the Billboard Hot 100. In Canada, the song reached number 26.

Recording
"Shotgun" was Walker's debut as a vocalistwhen the singer who was hired to perform at the recording session did not show up, Walker stood in. Rather than re-record the vocal at a later date, producer Gordy decided to keep Walker's take, much to the latter's surprise. 

The song opens with the sound of a shotgun blast and a drum roll, with the verses alternating between Walker's vocals and tenor saxophone fills. It does not employ the typical progression, but remains on one chord throughout.

Personnel
 Junior Walker – tenor saxophone, lead vocals
 Willie Woods – lead guitar, harmony vocals
 Eddie Willis – rhythm guitar
 Johnny Griffith – Hammond organ
 Victor Thomas – keyboards
 James Jamerson – bass guitar
 Benny Benjamin – drums
 Jack Ashford – tambourine

Performances and renditions
In his biography, Robbie Robertson recalled an early performance of the song:
 

In July 1965, Jimi Hendrix, who was then touring with Little Richard, made his first television appearance performing the song. With Richard's backup band and vocalists Buddy and Stacy, he was filmed for Nashville's Channel 5 Night Train show. In 1966, the Norwegian R&B group Public Enemies performed the song in the film Hurra for Andersens. Their version reached number seven on Radio Luxembourg's Top 20 Chart. A version by Vanilla Fudge reached number 59 in Canada in 1969.

See also
 List of number-one R&B singles of 1965 (U.S.)

Footnotes

References

1965 songs
1965 singles
Junior Walker songs
Motown singles
Song recordings produced by Berry Gordy
Songs written by Junior Walker